Turkey and the United Arab Emirates share extensive cultural, military and economic ties, but relations have substantially deteriorated in recent years.

Economic relations
Turkey is one of the UAE's largest trading partners, with US$9 billion in annual bilateral trade volume - triggering a rise of 800 percent in the last seven years; the year of 2008 saw foreign trade figures reveal Turkey as one of the UAE's top 10 biggest suppliers while over the past five years (2004-2008), UAE's exports to Turkey have increased six-fold. In an attempt to enhance tourism bonds, the UAE launched new Etihad Airways flights to Istanbul in 2009, serving the city four times a week.

Emirati businessmen have been encouraged by multiple real estate agencies to invest in Turkey, as part of Turkey's ongoing privatization efforts. In 2010, both sides pledged on improving commercial relations through common projects and convene officials in the future to determine possible areas of cooperation.

There is considerable Turkish presence in the UAE including Turkish construction companies which have put their signature on many developments in the region. In addition, there is a small community of Turks in the United Arab Emirates. According to the Turkish embassy, the number of Turkish companies established in the UAE is over 400, with 75 of those operating in and around Abu Dhabi.

On 24 November 2021, Turkey and the United Arab Emirates signed accords on energy and technology investments after talks between President Tayyip Erdogan and Abu Dhabi Crown Prince Sheikh Mohammed bin Zayed al-Nahyan in Ankara.

Diplomatic relations
In May 2017, the UAE's Ambassador to the United States, Yousef Al Otaiba described Turkey under Erdoğan as a "long-term threat" to both the UAE and the United States.

In December 2017, the UAE's foreign minister, Abdullah bin Zayed Al Nahyan, shared a tweet that claimed an Ottoman general had robbed Medina during Ottoman rule. Turkish President Recep Tayyip Erdogan responded by describing him as an "impertinent man" who was "spoiled by oil". Emirati diplomat Anwar Gargash then stated, "The sectarian and partisan view is not an acceptable alternative, and the Arab world will not be led by Tehran or Ankara."

In March 2018, Gargash stated that relations between the countries "aren’t in their best state" and called on Turkey to "respect Arab sovereignty and deal with its neighbors with wisdom and rationality".

In May 2018, Gargash called for Arab countries to unite against rising Turkish and Iranian influence in the Middle East.

Egyptian Crisis (2011–14)

The diplomatic relations between the two countries have soured over differing attitudes to the Egyptian crisis and its aftermath, with Turkey backing the Muslim Brotherhood of Egypt and the UAE supporting military rule under President Abdel Fattah el-Sisi.

2016 Turkish coup d'état attempt

Turkey accused UAE of supporting the 2016 Turkish coup d'état attempt, with a series of leaked emails in June 2017 by Otaiba lending credence to this allegation.

Qatar diplomatic crisis

The UAE has been critical of Turkey's backing of Qatar during the 2017–18 Qatar diplomatic crisis.

Syrian Civil War

In August 2017, the UAE accused Turkey of "colonial and competitive behavior" by "trying to reduce the sovereignty of the Syrian state" through its military presence in Syria.

The UAE has provided support for the Kurdish-dominated Syrian Democratic Forces, which fought against Turkish troops in northern Syria. Turkey has accused the UAE of also supporting the Kurdistan Workers' Party in its conflict with the Turkish government.

Yemeni Civil War

In May 2018, Turkey expressed concern towards the deployment of Emirati troops in Socotra without the Yemeni government being informed beforehand, claiming it presents "a new threat to the territorial integrity and sovereignty of Yemen".

Armenian genocide and UAE's cooperation with Armenia
In 2019, the United Arab Emirates' leadership announced it would begin the formal process to recognize the Armenian genocide. Emirate of Abu Dhabi had become the first emirate to recognize the genocide in April 2019.

In February 2020, Armenia's Minister of High-Tech Industry Hakob Arshakyan led a delegation to the UMEX and SimTEX 2020 exhibitions in Abu Dhabi. Mohammed Ahmed Al-Bowardi, the Minister of State for Defense of the UAE met with Arshakyan, and they discussed strengthening cooperation in both countries' military industries and defence sectors. Later, when the 2020 Nagorno-Karabakh conflict erupted, the United Arab Emirates-based Al Arabiya channel openly broadcast Armenian President Armen Sargsyan's speech blasting Turkey and Azerbaijan for the war.

Abraham Accords

Turkey condemned the establishment of diplomatic relations between Israel and UAE. The Turkish government threatened to suspend diplomatic relations and recall its ambassador from Abu Dhabi over the Israel-UAE agreement.

Reconciliation
Turkey and the UAE reconciled in 2022, with Erdogan visiting Abu Dhabi to meet UAE Crown Prince Mohammed bin Zayed and signing currency swap and trade agreements between the two countries.

See also
 Foreign relations of Turkey
 Foreign relations of the United Arab Emirates
 Azerbaijan–United Arab Emirates relations

References

 
United Arab Emirates
Bilateral relations of the United Arab Emirates